Ian "JR" Ritchie Jr. is an American pitcher for Atlanta Braves organization.

Early life and amateur career
Ritchie lives on Bainbridge Island, Washington, where he attended Bainbridge High School.  His sophomore season was canceled due to the COVID-19 pandemic. During that year, Ritchie added 20 pounds of muscle to his build, which resulted in increased velocity on his pitches. He was named the Gatorade Washington Baseball Player of the Year as a junior after he went 6–0 record with a 0.38 earned run average (ERA) and 54 strikeouts in  innings pitched while also batting .531 with 24 runs scored. He committed to play college baseball at UCLA. Ritchie emerged as high-round prospect for the Major League Baseball (MLB) draft during his senior season. Following the end of his senior season, he participated in the 2022 Draft Combine.

Professional career
Ritchie was selected by the Atlanta Braves with the 35th overall selection of the 2022 MLB draft. He signed with the team and received an over-slot signing bonus of $2.4 million.

References

External links

Living people
Baseball players from Washington (state)
People from Bainbridge Island, Washington
2003 births
Florida Complex League Braves players
Augusta GreenJackets players